Greta Johanne Solfall (born 25 June 1959) is a Norwegian politician for the Progress Party.

She served as a deputy representative to the Parliament of Norway from Nordland during the terms 2009–2013 and 2013–2017. She resides in Glomfjord and has been the deputy mayor of Meløy since 2011.

References

1959 births
Living people
People from Meløy
Deputy members of the Storting
Progress Party (Norway) politicians
Nordland politicians
Women members of the Storting
21st-century Norwegian women politicians
21st-century Norwegian politicians